Rottweiler is a 2004 science fiction horror film directed by Brian Yuzna and starring William Miller, Paulina Gálvez, Paul Naschy and Ivana Baquero.

Plot   
In the near future (2018), a prisoner named Dante (William Miller) escapes from jail after having been arrested for illegally entering Spain. Forced to kill a prison guard, he is hunted down by the prison's dog, a monstrous Rottweiler police dog that sadistic prison warden Kufard (Paul Naschy) had revived and cybernetically enhanced after a fatal injury. Believing his Spanish girlfriend Ula (Irene Montala) was sent to work as a prostitute in Puerto Angel as punishment, Dante looks for her, but is exhausted by the chase and wounded by the Rottweiler. As a result, he starts having hallucinations and being haunted by the repressed memories of his and Ula's arrest.

While on the run, Dante comes across a small farm owned by a young woman named Alyah who trains a shotgun on him while being accompanied by a little girl. Holding Dante up at gunpoint she coerces him into her house. There, she asks for his identity to which he says his name is Dante. Alyah then ushers him into her bedroom where she asks if he escaped from the prison to which Dante confirms. When she further asks why is he in Kufard's prison, Dante explains that he was on a boat from Rabat but had no papers that would have allowed him to travel from it legally. He tells her that he is not going to hurt her, that he never hurt anybody and that he just needs help while Alyah pulls a knife out of the drawer after setting the shotgun down. Alyah then cleans a wound on the back of Dante's leg.

Now held at knifepoint, Dante goes on to explain that he has to get to Puerto Angel as he needs to find someone. Alyah tells Dante that when her husband comes home it will be bad for him but that she can help him and that she knows someone who can take care of him. Alyah pushes Dante onto the bed and removes her headscarf and unfastens her dress. She says to him that since he is here without papers he does not have much of a future. Alyan pulls off her dress explaining to Dante that if you're pretty people hide you forever from your work. She then climbs on top of him while telling him that you belong to everyone who can pay and that it changes you as you might even like it. Alyah then kisses Dante and they start to make love. When Dante protests saying that he needs her to help him she says that she does not like men and could kill him no problem. She further explains that in Puerto Angel she "was a puta" under the employ of Kufard and that she was stoned most of the time, which is what led her to dislike men. Alyah then says that her daughter, the little girl who was with her, came into her life and she named her Esperanza (after the Spanish word for "hope") as she is her hope.

Esperanza, having seen the Rottweiler, runs to tell Alyah but is told to get out. As Alyah continues to make love to Dante she tells him that one of her regular clients, Santiago, was a priest who had a weakness for her. After sleeping together they never touched each other again and so instead they prayed. While this has been going on Esperanza has seen the Rottweiler kill the farm's dogs. She goes to tell Alyah again but her warnings are once again dismissed. Alyah informs Dante that she always stays on the farm for Esperanza so she will have a place to stay and will not be like her. Esperanza locks the door to keep the Rottweiler from entering then calls for Alyah. Alyah runs into the living room and blasts the Rottweiler with shotgun. However this fails to kill it and it manages to destroy the shotgun when Dante tries to shoot it. The Rottweiler chases the trio through the house and despite Dante's efforts to distract the dog it chases down and kills Alyah when she locks Esperanza in a food storage cellar in the yard.

Dante takes the terrified girl out of the cellar but then the Rottweiler comes after them. However Dante manages to trap it in the cellar but the dog manages to escape. The two then sneak aboard the semi trailer of a truck but the dog pursues them, eventually landing on top of it. The noise attracts the attention of one of the drivers and she is killed when she goes to inspect it. Realizing the danger Esperanza is in as long as he is with her Dante flees the semi trailer with the Rottweiler in tow and the scared but safe Esperanza is found by the other driver. As he reaches Puerto Angel and cannot find her at the brothel, he finally remembers that Ula got killed when Kufard let his dog loose on her, which led Dante to beat the dog to near death with a pipe, who was then turned into a cyborg. Dante brutally kills Kufard after a fierce struggle as the Rottweiler catches up with him, and they fight to the death among the burning remains of Kufard's crashed helicopter. The morning after, firemen find the skeletons of Dante, Ula and the Rottweiler on the beach.

Cast 
 William Miller as Dante
 Irene Montalà as Ula
 Paulina Gálvez as Alyah
 Cornell John as Dongoro
 Lluís Homar as Guard Borg
 Paul Naschy as Warden Kufard
 Ivana Baquero as Esperanza

Critical reception 
Allmovie called the film "a killer cyborg dog flick that's filled with more sleeping pills than chilling thrills" and "an obvious misstep for Yuzna, whose past successes are fastly fading in time. Do yourself a favor and leave this dog bone of a mess alone – you'll be happy that you did."

References

External links

2004 films
2004 horror films
English-language Spanish films
Films directed by Brian Yuzna
Films shot in Barcelona
Spanish independent films
Natural horror films
Films about dogs
Robot films
2004 independent films
Spanish science fiction horror films
2000s science fiction horror films
2000s English-language films